Medication costs, also known as drug costs are a common health care cost for many people and health care systems. Prescription costs are the costs to the end consumer. Medication costs are influenced by multiple factors such as patents, stakeholder influence, and marketing expenses. A number of countries including Canada, parts of Europe, and Brazil use external reference pricing as a means to compare drug prices and to determine a base price for a particular medication. Other countries use pharmacoeconomics, which looks at the cost/benefit of a product in terms of quality of life, alternative treatments (drug and non-drug), and cost reduction or avoidance in other parts of the health care system (for example, a drug may reduce the need for a surgical intervention, thereby saving money). Structures like the UK's National Institute for Health and Clinical Excellence and to a lesser extent Canada's Common Drug Review (a division of the Canadian Agency for Drugs and Technologies in Health) evaluate products in this way.

Medication costs can be listed in a number of ways including cost per defined daily dose, cost per specific period of time, cost per prescribed daily dose, and cost proportional to gross national product.

A November 2020 study found that more than 1.1 million senior citizens in the U.S. Medicare program are expected to die prematurely over the next decade because they will be unable to afford their prescription medications, requiring an additional $17.7 billion to be spent annually on avoidable medical costs due to health complications.

Definition
Medication costs can be the selling price from the manufacturer, that price together with shipping, the wholesale price, the retail price, and the dispensed price.

The dispensed price or prescription cost is defined as a cost which the patient has to pay to get medicines or treatments which are written as directions on prescription by a prescribers. The cost is generally influenced by a financial relationship between pharmaceutical manufacturers, wholesale distributors and pharmacies. In addition to the financial relationship, each nation has different systems to control the cost of prescriptions. In the United States, a pharmacy benefit manager, a third-party organization, such as private insurances or government-run health insurances will implement cost containment programs, such as establishing a formulary, to contain the cost.  In the United Kingdom, the government negotiates an overall cap on drugs bill growth with the pharmaceutical industry. In addition a government agency, the National Institute of Health and Care Excellence (NICE) assesses cost effectiveness of individual prescription drugs pricing. The National Health Service also may negotiate direct with individual pharmaceutical companies for certain specialised medicines, as well as running competitive procurements for generic drugs and for patented medicines where there is more than one drug available for a condition.Prescription costs are a regular health care cost for the sick and may mean economic hardship for the underprivileged.
With healthcare insurance, the patient in the U.S. pays a co-pay (the amount the patient must pay for each drug or medical visit), a deductible (the amount the patient has to pay before the insurance starts sharing the cost) and co-insurance (the amount the patient has to pay after deductible) for prescription costs. After reaching the out of pocket maximum, the insurance company will pay 100% of the prescription cost. The amount the patient has to pay depends on the healthcare insurance plan the patient has.

As of 2017, prescription costs range from just more than 15% in high income countries to 25% in lower-middle income countries and low income countries.

Factors 

Pricing any pharmaceutical drug for sale to the general public is daunting. Per Forbes, setting a high ceiling price for a new drug could be problematic as physicians could shy away from prescribing the drug, because the cost could be too great for the benefit. Setting too low of a price could imply inferiority, that the drug is too "weak" for the market. There are many different pricing strategies and factors that go into the research and evaluation of a future drug’s price with whole departments within US pharmaceutical companies like Pfizer devoted to cost analysis. However, the cost analysis and hesitation for producing drugs deemed "too weak" for the market is merely a guise for companies sacrificing their professional obligations in favor of making profits. As illustrated by the top 10 pharmaceutical companies raking in 400 billion dollars yearly, drug pricing is not a result of market conditions or government regulation, but of corporate greed at the expense of millions of Americans. Mark Cuban's www.costplusdrugs.com is an example of a billionaire sacrificing some profit to provide affordable healthcare. His 15% markup (often pricing a drug at 10-15 dollars) compares tremendously to Big Pharma charging thousands of dollars for certain drugs.

This chart shows discrepancies in drug pricing in different countries.

Marketing expenses 
A study has placed the amount spent on drug marketing at 2-19 times that on drug research.

Research and development 
Much research, needed to create drugs is done by the public sector. In addition, pharmaceutical companies also do much research prior to producing medications. The table shows research and development statistics for pharmaceutical companies as of 2013 per Astra Zeneca.

Severin Schwan, the CEO of the Swiss company Roche, reported in 2012 that Roche’s research and development costs in 2014 amounted to $8.4 billion, a quarter of the entire National Institutes of Health budget. Given the profit-driven nature of pharmaceutical companies and their research and development expenses, companies use their research and development expenses as a starting point to determine appropriate yet profitable prices.

Pharmaceutical companies spend a large amount on research and development before a drug is released to the market and costs can be further divided into three major fields: the discovery into the drug’s specific medical field, clinical trials, and failed drugs.

Discovery 
The process of drug discovery can involve scientists determining the germs, viruses, and bacteria that cause a specific disease or illness. The time frame can range from 3–20 years and costs can range between several million to tens of millions of dollars. Research teams attempt to break down disease components to find abnormal events/processes taking place in the body. Only then do scientists work on developing chemical compounds to treat these abnormalities with the aid of computer models.

After "discovery" and a creation of a chemical compound, pharmaceutical companies move forward with the Investigational New Drug (IND) Application from the FDA. After the investigation into the drug and given approval, pharmaceutical companies can move into pre-clinical trials and clinical trials.

Trials 
Drug development and pre-clinical trials focus on non-human subjects and work on animals such as rats.

The Food and Drug Administration requires at least 3 phases of clinical trials that assess the side effects and the effectiveness of the drug. An analysis of trial costs of approved drugs by the FDA from 2015-2016 found that out of 138 clinical trials, 59 new therapeutic agents were approved by the FDA. These trials have a median estimated cost of $19 million US dollars.

 Phase 1 lasts several months and aims to assess the safety and dosage of the drug. The purpose is to determine how the drug affects the body.
 Phase 2 lasts several months to two years and aims to assess the efficacy and side effect profile of the drug.
 Phase 3 lasts 1 to 4 years and aims to continue assessing and monitoring the efficacy and side effects of the drug. Phase 3 aims to determine the risks and benefits of a drug to its intended patient population.
 Phase 4 trials occur after the drug is approved by the FDA and aims to continue monitoring safety and efficacy of the drug.

Of these phases, the phase 3 is the most costly process of drug development. A single phase 3 trial can cost upwards of $100 million. It accounts for about 90 percent of the cost to pharmaceutical companies to develop a medication.

Failed drugs 
The processes of "discovery" and clinical trials amounts to approximately 12 years from research lab to the patient, in which about 10% of all drugs that start pre-clinical trials ever make it to actual human testing. Each pharmaceutical company (who have hundreds of drugs moving in and out of these phases) will never recuperate the costs of "failed drugs". Thus, profits made from one drug need to cover the costs of previous "failed drugs".

Relationship 

Overall, research and development expenses relating to a pharmaceutical drug amount to the billions. For example, it was reported that AstraZeneca spent upwards on average of $11 billion per drug for research and developmental purposes. The average of $11 billion only comprises the "discovery" costs, pre-clinical and clinical trial costs, and other expenses. With the addition of "failed drug" costs, the $11 billion easily amounts to over $20 billion in expenses. Therefore, an appropriate figure like $60 billion would be approximate sales figure that a pharmaceutical company like AstraZeneca would aim to generate to cover these costs and make a profit at the same time.

Total research and development costs provide pharmaceutical companies a ballpark estimation of total expenses. This is important in setting projected profit goals for a particular drug and thus, is one of the most necessary steps pharmaceutical companies take in pricing a particular drug.

A 2022 study invalidated the common argument  for high medication costs that research and development investments are reflected in and necessitate the treatment costs, finding no correlation for investments in drugs (for cases where transparency was sufficient) and their costs.

Stakeholders
Patients and doctors can also have some input in pricing, though indirectly. Customers in the United States have been protesting the high prices for recent "miracle" drugs like Daraprim and Harvoni, both of which attempt to cure or treat major diseases (HIV/AIDS and hepatitis C). Public outcry has worked in many cases to control and even decide the pricing for some drugs. For example, there was severe backlash over Daraprim, a drug that treats toxoplasmosis. Turing Pharmaceuticals under the leadership of Martin Shkreli raised the price of the drug 5,500% from $13.50 to $750 per pill. After denouncement from 2016 presidential candidates Hillary Clinton and Bernie Sanders, Martin Shkreli said he would reduce the price but later decided not to.

With the recent trend of price gouging, legislators have introduced reform to curb these hikes, effectively controlling the pricing of drugs in the United States. Hillary Clinton announced a proposal to help patients with chronic and severe health conditions by placing a nationwide monthly cap of $250 on prescription out-of-pocket drugs.

Research for a drug that is curing something no one has ever cured before will cost much more than research for the medicine of a very common disease that has known treatments. Also, there would be more patients for a more common ailment so that prices would be lower. Soliris only treats two extremely rare diseases, so the number of consumers is low, making it an orphan drug. Soliris still makes money because of its high price of over $400,000 per year per patient. The benefit of this drug is immense because it cures very rare diseases that would cost much more money to treat otherwise, which saves insurance companies and health agencies millions of dollars. Hence, insurance companies and health agencies are willing to pay these prices.

Public policy
Policy makers in some countries have placed controls on the amount pharmaceutical companies can raise the price of drugs. In 2017, Democratic party leaders proposed the creation of a new federal agency to investigate and perhaps fine drug manufacturers who make unjustified price increases. Pharmaceutical companies would be required to submit a justification for a drug with a “significant price increase” within at least 30 days of implementation. Under the terms of the proposal, Mylan’s well-publicized price increase for its EpiPen product would fall below the criteria for a significant price increase, while the 5000% overnight increase of Turing Pharmaceuticals Daraprim (pyrimethamine) would be subject to regulatory action.

Patents and monopoly rights 

One of the most important factors that determine the cost of a drug is the availability of competing drugs and treatments.  Having two or more manufacturers producing drugs for the same disease tends to reduce costs.

Patent laws give pharmaceutical companies the exclusive right to market a drug for a period of time, allowing them to extract a high monopoly price. For example, U.S. patent law grants a monopoly for 20 years after filing.  After that period, the same product from different manufacturers - known as generic drugs - can be sold, usually resulting in a substantial price reduction and possible shift in market share. Two patents that are commonly used are process patents and drug product patents. Process patents only provide developers intellectual claim to the methods in which the product was manufactured, so a competitor can make the same drug by a different method without violating the patent.

In some cases, a new treatment is more effective than an older treatment, or a given drug may work better than competitors for only some patients.  The availability of an imperfect substitution erodes prices to a lesser degree than would a perfect substitute.

Some countries grant additional protections from competition for a limited period, such as test data exclusivity or supplementary protection certificates.  Additional incentives are available in some jurisdictions for manufacturers of orphan drugs for rare diseases, including extended monopoly protection, tax credits, waived fees, and relaxed approval processes due to the small number of affected patients.

Transparency
In the United States in 2019 there were efforts to improve drug price transparency in television advertising. The pharmaceutical industry, however, successfully challenged the legislation.

Effects on consumers
When the price of medicine goes up the quality of life of consumers who need the medicine decreases. Consumers who have increased costs for medicine are more likely to change their lifestyle to spend less money on groceries, entertainment, and routine family needs. They are more likely to go into debt or postpone paying their existing debts. High drug prices can prevent people from saving for retirement. It is not uncommon for typical people to have challenges paying medical bills. Some people fail to get the medical care they need due to lack of money to pay for it. In low and middle income countries up to 90% of people pay for medications out of pocket. A November 2020 study by the West Health Policy Center stated that more than 1.1 million senior citizens in the U.S. Medicare program are expected to die prematurely over the next decade because they will be unable to afford their prescription medications, requiring an additional $17.7 billion to be spent annually on avoidable medical costs due to health complications.

Common measures taken to reduce costs 
Consumers commonly respond to high or increasing drug prices by doing what they can to save drug costs. The most commonly recommended course of action for consumers who seek to lower their drug costs is for them to tell their own doctor and pharmacist that they need to save money and then ask for advice. Doctors and pharmacists are professionals who know their fields and are the most likely source of information about options for reducing cost.

Depending on the country and health policies implemented, there are also options to search for the most convenient and affordable health insurance plans without having to consult a healthcare provider or obtain insurance through the employer. However, those who seek to purchase insurance individually through the individual market are most likely to be underinsured and therefore could potentially have a higher prescription cost.

There can be significant variation of prices for drugs in different pharmacies, even within a single geographical area. Because of this, some people check prices at multiple pharmacies to seek lower prices. Online pharmacies can offer low prices but many consumers using online services have experienced Internet fraud and other problems, such as long shipping times from overseas and a higher insecurity regarding quality, genuineness and safety of the ordered products.

Some consumers lower costs by asking their doctor for generic drugs when available. Because pharmaceutical companies often set prices by pills rather than by dose, consumers can sometimes buy double-dose pills, split the pills themselves with their doctor's permission, and save money in the process.

Not purchasing the medications / inaccessibility 
In countries without universal healthcare, there can be unaffordable out-of-pocket costs for needed medications. Approximately 25% of Americans find it difficult to afford prescription drugs. In the case of expensive anti-obesity medications it has been noted that many people "who could most benefit from weight loss may be unable to afford such expensive drugs". This may be of higher concern for conditions that are more risky or detrimental to health and/or which, unlike obesity, don't have additional treatment options that are both widely known and effective – like further improvements in diet and physical activity in the case of obesity. A study found that among U.S. Medicare beneficiaries without subsidies, 30% of prescriptions written for anticancer drugs, 22% for hepatitis C, and more than 50% for disease-modifying therapies for either immune system disorders or hypercholesterolemia were not filled by patients.

The right to science and culture is one of the rights in the Universal Declaration of Human Rights according to which "Everyone has the right freely to participate in the cultural life of the community, to enjoy the arts and to share in scientific advancement and its benefits."

Effects on healthcare systems 

While some have concluded that "drug development is likely to remain an expensive and resource-intensive process", a study found that wide range of medicines in the WHO Model List of Essential Medicines can be profitably manufactured at very low cost by pharmaceutical industries and that "Most EML medicines are sold in the UK and South Africa at prices significantly higher than those estimated from production costs".

Global spending on prescription drugs in 2020 may have been ~$1.3 trillion and "The high cost of prescription drugs threatens healthcare budgets, and limits funding available for other areas in which public investment is needed".

By region

United States

Prescription drug prices in the United States have been among the highest in the world. The high cost of prescription drugs became a major topic of discussion in the new millennium, leading up to the U.S. health care reform debate of 2009, and received renewed attention in 2015. High prices have been attributed to monopolies given to manufacturers by the government and a lack of ability for organizations to negotiate prices.

Individuals are able to enroll in health insurance plans, which often include prescription medication coverage. However, insurance companies decide which drugs they will cover by creating a formulary. If a medication is not on this list, the insurance company may require people to pay more money out-of-pocket compared to other medications that are on the formulary. There are also often tiers within this approved drug list, as the insurance company may be willing to cover a portion of one drug but prefer and completely cover a cheaper alternative.

Medicare Part D is a branch of Medicare that helps to cover costs of prescription medications for patients aged 65 and up. From 2010 to 2018, the Part D plan "nearly quadrupled" its spending on the catastrophic coverage phase. This increase in spending is attributed to the rising pricing of prescription medications.

United Kingdom

It varies by region in the United Kingdom. In Wales, Scotland and Northern Ireland prescription costs have been completely abolished, however in England the current prescription cost for adults as of 1 April 2021 is £9.35 per item dispensed. There are subsidised costs for those claiming Universal Credit.

Developing world
In developing countries medications make up between 25 and 70% of health care costs. Many medications are beyond the reach of the majority of the population. There have been attempts both by international agreements and by pharmaceutical companies to provide drugs at low cost, either supplied by manufacturers who own the drugs, or manufactured locally as generic versions of drugs which are elsewhere protected by patent. Countries without manufacturing capability may import such generics.

The legal framework regarding generic versions of patented drugs is formalised in the Doha Declaration on Trade-Related Aspects of Intellectual Property Rights and later agreements.

See also 
 Criticism of patents#Proposed alternatives to the patent system
 Cost of drug development
 Generic drug
 Health policy
 Inverse benefit law
 Pyrimethamine pricing history
 Prescription drug
 Unitaid
 Examples of drug controversies:

References

Further information

External links
Database of International Medication Prices
International Medical Products Price Guide
Multi-country price sources

Pharmaceutical industry
Pharmacy
Drug pricing